Kiar County is in Chaharmahal and Bakhtiari province, Iran. The capital of the county is the city of Shalamzar. At the 2006 census, the region's population (as a parts of Ardal County and Shahrekord County) was 52,360 in 12,608 households. The following census in 2011 counted 58,047 people in 16,298 households, by which time those parts had been separated from their counties to form Kiar County. At the 2016 census, the county's population was 50,976 in 15,548 households, by which time Dastgerd Rural District had been separated from the county to rejoin Shahrekord County.

Administrative divisions

The population history and structural changes of Kiar County's administrative divisions over three consecutive censuses are shown in the following table. The latest census shows two districts, four rural districts, and four cities.

References

 

Counties of Chaharmahal and Bakhtiari Province